East Mill is the name of a number of mills.

Windmills

East Mill, Billinghay, a windmill in Lincolnshire
East Mill, Brighton, a windmill in East Sussex
East Mill, Briston, a windmill in Norfolk
East Mill, Caister, a windmill in Norfolk
East Mill, Findsbury Fields, Clerkenwell, a windmill in Middlesex
East Mill, Corringham, a windmill in Lincolnshire
East Mill, Great Chesterford, a windmill in Essex
East Mill, Halstead, a windmill in Essex
East Mill, Hardwick, a windmill in Norfolk
East Mill, Hornsea,  a windmill in the East Riding of Yorkshire
East Mill, Keyingham,  a windmill in the East Riding of Yorkshire
East Mill, Patrington  a windmill in the East Riding of Yorkshire
East Mill, Poringland, a windmill in Norfolk
East Mill, Radwinter, a windmill in Essex
East Mill, Smarden, a windmill in Kent
East Mill, Southminster, a windmill in Essex
East Mill, Wethersfield, a windmill in Essex
East Mill, Worthing, a windmill in West Sussex